Necrosciinae is a subfamily of the stick insect family Lonchodidae, with its greatest diversity in South-East Asia.

The subfamilies Necrosciinae and Lonchodinae, formerly part of Diapheromeridae, were determined to make up a separate family and were transferred to the re-established family Lonchodidae in 2018.

Genera 
The Phasmida Species File includes the genera below; most belong to the tribe Necrosciini Brunner von Wattenwyl, 1893:

Korinnini
Auth.: Günther, 1953; distribution: India, Thailand, Malesia
 Kalocorinnis Günther, 1944
 Korinnis Günther, 1932

Necrosciini 

 Acacus Brunner von Wattenwyl, 1907
 Acanthophasma Chen & He, 2000
 Anarchodes Redtenbacher, 1908
 Anasceles Redtenbacher, 1908
 Andropromachus Carl, 1913
 Asceles Redtenbacher, 1908
 Aschiphasmodes Karny, 1923
 Asystata Redtenbacher, 1908
 Austrosipyloidea Brock & Hasenpusch, 2007
 Brevinecroscia Seow-Choen, 2016
 Brockphasma Ho, Liu, Bresseel & Constant, 2014
 Calvisia Stål, 1875
 Capuyanus Bresseel & Constant, 2017
 Candovia Stål, 1875
 Capuyanus Bresseel & Constant, 2017
 Caudasceles Seow-Choen, 2017
 Centrophasma Redtenbacher, 1908
 Channia Seow-Choen, 2016
 Cheniphasma Ho, 2012
 Conlephasma Gottardo & Heller, 2012
 Conogalactea Seow-Choen, 2018
 Cornicandovia Hasenpusch & Brock, 2007
 Diacanthoidea Redtenbacher, 1908
 Diangelus Brunner von Wattenwyl, 1907
 Dianphasma Chen & He, 1997
 Diardia Redtenbacher, 1908
 Diesbachia Redtenbacher, 1908
 Eurynecroscia Dohrn, 1910
 Galactea Redtenbacher, 1908
 Gargantuoidea Redtenbacher, 1908
 Gibbernecroscia Brock, Hasenpusch & Petrović, 2019
 Hemiplasta Redtenbacher, 1908
 Hemisosibia Redtenbacher, 1908
 Hennemannia Seow-Choen, 2016
 Huananphasma Ho, 2013
 Labanphasma Seow-Choen, 2016
 Laevediacantha Seow-Choen, 2016
 Lamachodes Redtenbacher, 1908
 Lobonecroscia Brock & Seow-Choen, 2000
 Lopaphus Westwood, 1859
 Loxopsis Westwood, 1859
 Macrocercius Seow-Choen, 2017
 Maculonecroscia Seow-Choen, 2016
 Malandella Sjöstedt, 1918
 Marmessoidea Brunner von Wattenwyl, 1893
 Meionecroscia Redtenbacher, 1908
 Mesaner Redtenbacher, 1908
 Micadina Redtenbacher, 1908
 Moritasgus Günther, 1935
 Necroscia Serville, 1838
 Neoasceles Seow-Choen, 2016
 Neoclides Uvarov, 1940
 Neohirasea Rehn, 1904
 Neonescicroa Seow-Choen, 2016
 Neooxyartes Ho, 2018
 Neoqiongphasma Ho, 2013
 Neososibia Chen & He, 2000
 Notaspinius Seow-Choen, 2017
 Nuichua Bresseel & Constant, 2018
 Oedohirasea Ho, 2020
 Orthonecroscia Kirby, 1904
 Orthostheneboea Seow-Choen, 2016
 Orxines (phasmid) Stål, 1875
 Otraleus Günther, 1935
 Ovacephala Seow-Choen, 2016
 Oxyartes Stål, 1875
 Pachyscia Redtenbacher, 1908
 Paracandovia Forni, Cussigh, Brock, Jones, Nicolini, Martelossi, Luchetti & Mantovani, 2022
 Paradiacantha Redtenbacher, 1908
 Paraloxopsis Günther, 1932
 Paramenexenus Redtenbacher, 1908
 Paranecroscia Redtenbacher, 1908
 Paraprosceles Chen & He, 2004
 Parasinophasma Chen & He, 2006
 Parasipyloidea Redtenbacher, 1908
 Parasosibia Redtenbacher, 1908
 Parastheneboea Redtenbacher, 1908
 Paroxyartes Carl, 1913
 Phaenopharos Kirby, 1904
 Phamartes Bresseel & Constant, 2013
 Planososibia Seow-Choen, 2016
 Platysosibia Redtenbacher, 1908
 Pomposa Redtenbacher, 1908
 Pseudocentema Chen, He & Li, 2002
 Pseudodiacantha Redtenbacher, 1908
 Pseudoneoclides Seow-Choen, 2016
 Pseudoparamenexenus Ho, 2016
 Pseudososibia Ho, 2017
 Qiongphasma Chen, He & Li, 2002
 Rhamphosipyloidea Redtenbacher, 1908
 Sabahphasma Seow-Choen, 2016
 Scionecra Karny, 1923
 Septopenna Seow-Choen, 2016
 Singaporoidea Seow-Choen, 2017
 Sinophasma Günther, 1940
 Sipyloidea Brunner von Wattenwyl, 1893
 Sosibia Stål, 1875
 Spinohirasea Zompro, 2002
 Spinosipyloidea Hasenpusch & Brock, 2007
 Sumatranius Seow-Choen, 2018
 Syringodes Redtenbacher, 1908
 Tagesoidea Redtenbacher, 1908
 Thrasyllus Stål, 1877
 Trachythorax Redtenbacher, 1908
 Varieganecroscia Seow-Choen, 2016

References

External links 
 
 Phasmid Study Group: Necrosciinae

Lonchodidae
Phasmatodea subfamilies